The Delta 4000 series was an American expendable launch system which was used to conduct two orbital launches in 1989 and 1990. It was a member of the Delta family of rockets. Although several variants were put forward, only the Delta 4925 was launched. The designations used a four digit numerical code to store information on the configuration of the rocket. It was built from a combination of spare parts left over from earlier Delta rockets, which were being retired, and parts from the Delta II 6000-series, which was just entering service.

The first stage was the MB-3-III powered Extended Long Tank Thor, previously flown on the 1000-series. Nine Castor-4A solid rocket boosters were attached to increase thrust at lift-off, replacing the less powerful Castor-4 boosters used on the 3000 series. The Delta-K was used as a second stage. A Star-48B PAM-D was used as a third stage, to boost payloads into geosynchronous transfer orbit.

Both Delta 4000 launches occurred from Launch Complex 17B at Cape Canaveral. The first launched Marco Polo 1 for BSkyB, and the second launched INSAT 1D for the Indian Space Research Organisation. Both were successful.

References

Delta (rocket family)